Wooden Nickels is the debut studio album by American rapper Cesar Comanche. The album was released through its own label, Defenders of the Free World, in 2000. The album was re-released in 2006, titled Wooden Nickels Revisited with 3 additional tracks. The production comes from then-unknown 9th Wonder, Big Dho and Yorel.

Track listing

2000 debut albums
Albums produced by 9th Wonder